Fernand Jeitz (born 29 September 1945) is a retired Luxembourgish footballer from Luxembourg who played as a defender.

Club career
A sweeper, Jeitz left his hometown club Aris Bonnevoie for French league side FC Metz in 1967. In 10 seasons there, he played a total of 357 games and also captained the team for 5 years. An achilles injury ended his stay at Metz.

International career
Jeitz made his debut for Luxembourg in a May 1965 World Cup qualification match against Norway and went on to earn 35 caps, no goals scored. He played in 12 FIFA World Cup qualification matches.

He played his final international game in April 1973, a 0–1 defeat by Switzerland.

Honours
 Luxembourg National Division: 1964, 1966

 Luxembourg Cup: 1967

References

External links
Player profile at FC Metz

1945 births
Living people
Sportspeople from Luxembourg City
Association football defenders
Luxembourgian footballers
Luxembourgian expatriate footballers
Luxembourg international footballers
FC Metz players
Thionville FC players
Ligue 1 players
Expatriate footballers in France